Michael David is a Broadway producer, the co-founder of and a partner in Dodger Theatricals. His productions on Broadway include Jersey Boys, Matilda The Musical, The Farnsworth Invention, The Secret Garden, Into the Woods, and the revival of The Music Man.

Prior to his work with Dodger Theatricals, he was the executive director of the Chelsea Theater Center of Brooklyn.

References

Chelsea on the Edge: The Adventures of an American Theater,  Napoleon, Davi. Iowa State University Press , 1991. A chronicle of the onstage productions and offstage troubles at the Chelsea Theater Center.
Contradictions: Notes on twenty-six years in the theatre (Hardcover), Prince, Harold. Dodd, Mead , 1974 autobiography features a chapter on his production of Candide at the Chelsea Theater Center.  
Hewes, Henry. "An Egoless Theater. " in Saturday Review, 29 July 1972, p. 66
Napoleon, Davi. "Staging the Unexpected at the Chelsea Theater Center." in Showbill February 1980. Stories of adventurous productions the Chelsea moved from Off-Broadway to on.
Napoleon, Davi. "Chelsea Goes Loco, Gears Up for Speed Trip." Courier Life Newspapers (Brooklyn, NY), 3 January 1977. Napoleon is a fly on the wall at Des McAnuff's rehearsal of "The Crazy Locomotive," with Glenn Close and other luminaries, produced by Michael David.
Napoleon, Davi. "Chelsea's Michael David." in The Phoenix (Brooklyn, NY), 23 January 1975 p 14. Profile of executive director Michael David. 
Severo, Richard. "The Chelsea: Success Story in Brooklyn, of All Places." in New York Times 28 May 1974
Tallmer,Jerry. "A Theater Grows in Brooklyn." in New York Post 20 March 1973

External links

 Chelsea Theater Center articles in the New York Times

Year of birth missing (living people)
Living people
American theatre managers and producers
Yale School of Drama alumni
Place of birth missing (living people)